The Cow Creek Limestone is a geologic formation in Texas. It preserves fossils dating back to the Cretaceous period.

See also 
 List of fossiliferous stratigraphic units in Texas
 Paleontology in Texas

References
 

Limestone formations of the United States
Cretaceous geology of Texas
Aptian Stage